Wilfred James "Bill" Gray  is a former senior Australian public servant, and specialist in Aboriginal affairs.

From 1987-88 he was Chairman of the Australian and Torres Strait Islander Commission (ATSIC) Task Force, and was Secretary of the Department of Aboriginal Affairs between 1988 and 1990. He was the inaugural Aboriginal and Torres Strait Islander Commission (ATSIC) CEO between 1990–91.

Between 1995 and 2000 he was the Commissioner of the Australian Electoral Commission (AEC).

Since his retirement in 2000, he has published academic reports on Aboriginal matters, and assisted the Federal Government on investigations into Indigenous programs.

References

Australian public servants
Year of birth missing (living people)
Place of birth missing (living people)
Living people
Australian Electoral Commissioners
Members of the Order of Australia